In the history of thermodynamics, On the Equilibrium of Heterogeneous Substances is a 300-page paper written by American chemical physicist Willard Gibbs. It is one of the founding papers in thermodynamics, along with German physicist Hermann von Helmholtz's 1882 paper "Thermodynamik chemischer Vorgänge." Together they form the foundation of chemical thermodynamics as well as a large part of physical chemistry.

Gibbs's Equilibrium marked the beginning of chemical thermodynamics by integrating chemical, physical, electrical, and electromagnetic phenomena into a coherent system. It introduced concepts such as chemical potential, phase rule, and others, which form the basis for modern physical chemistry. American writer Bill Bryson describes Gibbs's Equilibrium paper as "the Principia of thermodynamics".

On the Equilibrium of Heterogeneous Substances, was originally published in a relatively obscure American journal, the Transactions of the Connecticut Academy of Arts and Sciences, in several parts, during the years 1875 to 1878 (although most cite "1876" as the key year). It remained largely unknown until translated into German by Wilhelm Ostwald and into French by Henry Louis Le Châtelier.

Overview
Gibbs first contributed to mathematical physics with two papers published in 1873 in the Transactions of the Connecticut Academy of Arts and Sciences on "Graphical Methods in the Thermodynamics of Fluids," and "Method of Geometrical Representation of the Thermodynamic Properties of Substances by means of Surfaces." His subsequent and most important publication was "On the Equilibrium of Heterogeneous Substances" (in two parts, 1876 and 1878). In this monumental, densely woven, 300-page treatise, the first law of thermodynamics, the second law of thermodynamics, the fundamental thermodynamic relation, are applied to the predication and quantification of thermodynamic reaction tendencies in any thermodynamic system in a visual, three-dimensional graphical language of Lagrangian calculus and phase transitions, among others. As stated by Henri Louis Le Chatelier, it "founded a new department of chemical science that is becoming comparable in importance to that created by Lavoisier." This work was translated into German by W. Ostwald (who styled its author the "founder of chemical energetics") in 1891 and into French by H. le Chatelier in 1899.

Gibbs's "Equilibrium" paper is considered one of the greatest achievements in physical science in the 19th century and one of the foundations of the science of physical chemistry. In these papers Gibbs applied thermodynamics to the interpretation of physicochemical phenomena and showed the explanation and interrelationship of what had been known only as isolated, inexplicable facts.

Gibbs' papers on heterogeneous equilibria included:

 Some chemical potential concepts
 Some free energy concepts
 A Gibbsian ensemble ideal (basis of the statistical mechanics field)
 A phase rule

Opening section

Clausius

The comprehension of the laws which govern any material system is greatly facilitated by considering the energy and entropy of the system in the various states of which it is capable.  As the difference of the values of the energy for any two states represents the combined amount of work and heat received or yielded by the system when it is brought from one state to the other, and the difference of entropy is the limit of all possible values of the integral:

in which dQ denotes the element of heat received from external sources, and T is the temperature of the part of the system receiving it, the varying values of energy and entropy characterize in all that is essential the effect producible by the system in passing from one state to another. For by mechanical and thermodynamic contrivances, supposedly theoretically perfect, any supply of work and heat may be transformed into any other which does not differ from it either in the amount of work and heat taken together or in the value of the integral:

But it is not only in respect to the external relations of a system that its energy and entropy are of predominant importance.  As in the case of simple mechanical systems, such as are discussed in theoretical mechanics, which are capable of only one kind of action upon external systems, namely the performance of mechanical work, the function which expresses the capability of the system of this kind of action also plays the leading part in the theory of equilibrium, the condition of equilibrium being that the variation of this function shall vanish, so in a thermodynamic system, such as all material systems are, which is capable of two different kinds of action upon external systems, the two functions which express the twofold capabilities of the system afford an almost equally simple criterion for equilibrium.

References

External links

 At the Internet Archive, Part 1 and Part 2 in various file formats.

Thermodynamics literature
1870s in science
1876 in science
Physics books
Works originally published in American magazines
1876 non-fiction books
Works originally published in science and technology magazines